All That Must Be is the second studio album by English musician and producer George FitzGerald. It was released on 9 March 2018, under Double Six Records and Domino Recording Company.

Critical reception
All That Must Be was met with "generally favorable" reviews from critics. At Metacritic, which assigns a weighted average rating out of 100 to reviews from mainstream publications, this release received an average score of 72, based on 14 reviews. Aggregator Album of the Year gave the release a 71 out of 100 based on a critical consensus of 13 reviews.

Accolades

Track listing

Personnel

Musicians
 George FitzGerald – primary artist
 Oliver Bayston – vocals
 Lou Rhodes – vocals
 Hudson Scott – vocals
 Tracey Thorn – vocals
 Bonobo – vocals

Production
 TJ Carter – producer, vocals
 Matt Colton – mastering
 Scott Knapper – engineer
 Blue May – mixer

Charts

References

2018 albums
Double Six Records albums